Bienne Terita (born 16 May 2003) is an Australian rugby union and sevens player.

Biography 
Terita captained the Australian Youth Sevens team at the 2019 World Schools Sevens tournament in New Zealand. She was also named MVP of the tournament.

Terita was named in the Australian sevens team for the 2021–22 Sevens Series. She made her senior debut for Australia at the 2022 Spain Sevens in Málaga. She featured at the Canadian Sevens in Langford, British Columbia. She scored a try in her sides 58–0 victory over Mexico. She played at the France Sevens in Toulouse. She helped her side beat South Africa 50–0 in their opening match.

Terita missed out on selection for the Commonwealth Games so she made a move to fifteens with the World Cup in sight. She was named in the Australian squad for a two-test series against the Black Ferns for the O'Reilly Cup. She was named in the starting line-up in the second test against New Zealand and made her debut on 27 August 2022 in Adelaide. Terita scored two tries on debut.

Terita was selected in the Wallaroos side again for the delayed 2022 Rugby World Cup in New Zealand.

References

External links
Wallaroos Profile

2003 births
Living people
Australian female rugby union players
Australian female rugby sevens players
Australia women's international rugby union players